Taupo Airport (Māori: Te Papa Waka Rererangi o Taupō) is a small airport  to the south of Taupō township on the eastern shores of Lake Taupō, New Zealand.

Scheduled flights are operated by Air New Zealand Link, using Bombardier DHC-8-Q300 from Auckland, and Sounds Air, operating from Wellington using Pilatus PC-12. The airport is a popular destination for private jets, due to its close proximity to trout fishing, golf, hunting, skiing and luxury resorts.

A number of small charter and training operations are also based here along with maintenance providers and a large search and rescue facility. Taupo Airport is the busiest parachute drop zone in  New Zealand. Prior to the COVID-19 pandemic there were two commercial tandem skydiving companies operating from the airport, however one has since gone out of business as a result.

Airlines and destinations

Operational information
Airfield elevation 1335 ft AMSL
Runway 17/35, 1386 x 30 metres sealed
Runway 10/28, 670 x 32 metres grass
Runway lighting available
Pavement strength PCN 26 is advisory only
Traffic circuit: RWY 11/17 — right hand    RWY 29/35 — left hand
Circuit height: 2300 ft AMSL
RWY 10 is not available for takeoff
Grass parallel to Rwy 17/35 closed take-off and landing

Taupo Airport is located within a Mandatory Broadcast Zone (MBZ) in uncontrolled (G) airspace with type C airspace starting at 6500 ft AMSL and controlled by Christchurch Control.  Taupo Airport is the second-busiest non-towered airport in New Zealand.

2020 Taupō Airport re-development

Funded from Provincial Growth Fund, New Zealand Upgrade Programme and also the Taupō District Council, the project is expected to begin in March 2020 and be complete by October 2021.

The re-development will see a new terminal built that caters to the increase in traveller movements.  The apron size will also be increased once the old terminal has been removed, which will make room for more aircraft parking.  A new car park will also be developed within the airport.

Operators
Helicopter Services (BOP) Ltd
Heli Maintenance (BOP) Ltd
Lakeview Helicopters
Philips Search and Rescue Trust
Rotor and Wing Maintenance
Taupo Tandem Skydiving
Chopperworks
Super Air
Argus Aviation
Helisika

See also

 List of airports in New Zealand
 List of airlines of New Zealand

References

Sources
NZAIP Volume 4 AD

External links

TDC Airport re-development press release

Airports in New Zealand
Taupō
Buildings and structures in the Taupo District
Transport buildings and structures in Waikato